Audie Raymond Cole (born June 1, 1989) is a former American football linebacker.  He played college football at NC State and was drafted by the Minnesota Vikings in the seventh round of the 2012 NFL Draft.

Early years
Cole played as a quarterback, safety and linebacker at Monroe High School. He was a three-year starter at quarterback and also played defense as a senior. He threw for 3,285 yards and 23 touchdowns in his career and was named All-league as a senior after rushing for 10 touchdowns and throwing for more than 1,700 yards. Cole also lettered in baseball and basketball at Monroe, and was a Golden Glove winner in boxing.

Regarded as a two-star recruit, Cole was ranked as a top-30 player out of the state of Michigan by Rivals.com. He chose North Carolina State University after originally committing to Central Michigan.

College career
As a freshman at NC State in 2007, Cole redshirted the season at linebacker.

Freshman season (2008)

In 2008, Cole saw action mainly on special teams, and his 213 specialty snaps ranked third on the team. He totalled 14 tackles during his freshman season.

Sophomore season (2009)

As a sophomore in 2009, Cole started all 12 games, leading NC State's in tackles with 85 stops, finishing second in tackles for loss with eight and also tallying four sacks. He led the team in stops versus Florida State (9) and North Carolina (10). He racked up a career-high 13 tackles at Virginia Tech. He was recipient of the team's Al Michaels Award, which is given to the player who "puts team before self.

Junior season (2010)

As a junior in 2010, Cole played the Sam linebacker spot, but moved to middle linebacker in the spring, leading the defense with 809 snaps from scrimmage. He tied for the team lead in tackles with 97, while his 10.5 tackles for loss ranked third among Wolfpack players. He tied his career-high with 13 stops in the win at North Carolina. In that game, he had a six-yard sack and also recovered a fumble. He led the team in tackles at Central Florida with a dozen, including a sack, two others for loss, and also pulled down his first career interception. For his performance, Cole was named the ACC Defensive Back of the Week by the league and the ACC Player of the Week by Rivals.com.

Senior season (2011)

In the spring drills, Cole moved to middle linebacker for his senior season.

Professional career

Minnesota Vikings

Cole intercepted 2 passes, on consecutive plays, in the Vikings second preseason game against the Buffalo Bills returning both for touchdowns on August 17, 2012.

On November 7, 2013 Cole was waived by the Vikings to make room for OT Kevin Murphy who was signed out of the practice squad due to injuries on the team.

On November 9, 2013, Minnesota Vikings re-signed Audie Cole. In Week 13, he was named starting MLB, in place of Erin Henderson.

In Week 9 on November 8, 2015, Cole started his first game of the season in place of injured Eric Kendricks against the St. Louis Rams.  Unfortunately, Cole suffered a fractured ankle in the fourth quarter against the Rams, ending his season.

Jacksonville Jaguars 
On March 11, 2017, Cole signed with the Jacksonville Jaguars. He was released on August 26, 2017.

New Orleans Saints
On August 28, 2017, Cole signed with the New Orleans Saints. He was released on September 1, 2017.

Personal life
Cole cut his trademark long hair during the 2013 off season and donated to a charity program benefitting youth fighting cancer (Children With Hair Loss) in Michigan. He took part in 2013 Minnesota Governor's Fishing Opener weekend activities in Park Rapids, Minnesota, helping youth get involved in outdoor activities and helping promote outdoors programs through Minnesota Department of Natural Resources. He graduated in 2011 with a parks, recreation and tourism degree.

References

External links
 Minnesota Vikings profile
 NC State profile

1989 births
Living people
People from Monroe, Michigan
Sportspeople from Ypsilanti, Michigan
Players of American football from Michigan
American football linebackers
NC State Wolfpack football players
Minnesota Vikings players
Jacksonville Jaguars players
New Orleans Saints players